Ligue de Football de la Wilaya is the seventh-highest division in the Algerian football league system. The division has ? groups based on the Wilaya of the clubs in the country, with each Wilaya having two groups; Honneur and Pré-Honneur, each group contains ? teams from their respective Wilaya's. The league is governed by the Algerian Football Federation and the presidents of each Wilaya for each group(s). The Wilaya leagues are as follows:

Ligue de Football de la Wilaya de Ain Defla
Ligue de Football de la Wilaya d'Alger
Ligue de Football de la Wilaya de Annaba
Ligue de Football de la Wilaya de Chlef 
Ligue de Football de la Wilaya de Constantine
Ligue de Football de la Wilaya de Béjaïa
Ligue de Football de la Wilaya de Blida
Ligue de Football de la Wilaya de Bouira 
Ligue de Football de la Wilaya de Boumerdès
Ligue de Football de la Wilaya de Médéa
Ligue de Football de la Wilaya de Mila
Ligue de Football de la Wilaya de Tipaza
Ligue de Football de la Wilaya de Tizi-Ouzou 
Ligue de Football de la Wilaya de Tlemcen 
Ligue de Football de la Wilaya d'Oran
Ligue de Football de la Wilaya de Ghardaïa
Ligue de Football de la Wilaya de Relizane
Ligue de Football de la Wilaya de Sidi Bel Abbès

References

External links
Ligue de Football de la Wilaya de Alger Official website   
Ligue de Football de la Wilaya de Annaba Official website 
Ligue de Football de la Wilaya de Chlef Official website

Ligue de Football de la Wilaya de Constantine Official website
Ligue de Football de la Wilaya de Bouira Official website 
Ligue de Football de la Wilaya de Boumerdès Official website 
Ligue de Football de la Wilaya de Médéa Official website 
Ligue de Football de la Wilaya de Mila Official website 
Ligue de Football de la Wilaya de Tizi-Ouzou Official website 
Ligue de Football de la Wilaya de Tlemcen Official website 
Ligue de Football de la Wilaya de Oran Official website 
Ligue de Football de la Wilaya de Ghardaïa Official website 
Ligue de Football de la Wilaya de Relizane Official website
Ligue de Football de la Wilaya de Sidi Bel Abbès Official website

7